Nestori Lähde (born 12 August 1989) is a Finnish ice hockey player currently playing for Lukko of the Finnish Liiga.

References

External links

Living people
Tappara players
1989 births
HC TPS players
Lukko players
Finnish ice hockey forwards
People from Nokia, Finland
Sportspeople from Pirkanmaa